Ali Talib may refer to:

 Ali Talib Al-Ajmi (born 1984), Omani footballer
 Ali Talib (artist), Iraqi painter